Corcubión, or Corcubiom in the AGAL orthography of the Galician language, is a municipality of northwestern Spain in the Province of A Coruña, in the autonomous community of Galicia. The local government of the municipality was the first public institution to officially use the AGAL norm of the Galician language according to the Reintegrationism ideas, as seen in its website, offering options for "Galician" (NOMIGa) and "Galician-Portuguese" (AGAL), as well as English and Spanish.

It is located on the river with the same name.

History
Corcubión belonged to the county of Traba, but later passed into the hands of the Count of Altamira.

Demography 
From:INE Archiv

References
Official Website City Council of Corcubion

Municipalities in the Province of A Coruña